The 1999 VMI Keydets football team represented the Virginia Military Institute during the 1999 NCAA Division I-AA football season. It was the Keydets' 109th year of football and first season under head coach Cal McCombs, who replaced Ted Cain following the conclusion of the 1998 season.

VMI went 1–10 on the year, beating only Division II-Concord University, a 15–14 win. The Keydet offense was shut out three times and managed only 77 points all season, averaging 7.0 points per game.

Schedule

References

VMI
VMI Keydets football seasons
VMI Keydets football